Tsveiba (Abkhazian: Цәеиба) is an Abkhazian surname that may refer to:

Akhrik Tsveiba (born 1966), Soviet association football defender
Sandro Tsveiba (born 1993), Ukrainian-born Russian football player, son of Akhrik

Abkhaz-language surnames